John Lord Love (March 17, 1841 – 1899) was a California Republican politician.  He served as Assistant Attorney General and later Attorney General of California.

The character Hedley Lamarr in Blazing Saddles is based on him.

Death
Died in San Francisco in 1899.

External links
Brief biography and photo

References

1841 births
1899 deaths
California Attorneys General
19th-century American politicians